Flowers in the Attic is a 2014 Lifetime movie directed by Deborah Chow, starring Kiernan Shipka, Ellen Burstyn, Mason Dye, and Heather Graham. It is the second adaptation of V. C. Andrews’ 1979 novel of the same name.

A sequel, Petals on the Wind, based on the novel of the same name, premiered on May 26, 2014 on Lifetime. The network announced the developing of the following books in the series, If There Be Thorns and Seeds of Yesterday, which both aired in 2015.

Plot
In 1957, the Dollanganger children — 14-year-old Chris, 12-year-old Cathy, and 5-year-old twins Carrie and Cory — live happily with their parents, Christopher and Corrine, in Pennsylvania. This changes when Christopher dies in a car crash, leaving the family devastated and heavily in debt. Four months later, Corrine announces that they are going to move and live with her wealthy parents in Virginia. She explains to her children that she was estranged from her parents and that's why she changed her last name.

On arrival at Foxworth Hall, Corrine's grim, claustrophobic and cold-hearted mother, Olivia, takes the children to a small room in the attic. The next day, the children are given a list of rules and Olivia tells them to stay in the attic at all times. Corrine explains that her father, Malcolm, disowned her for eloping with Christopher, who was actually her biological half-uncle (her father's younger half-brother) and they were disinherited. She promises the children she will make her father forgive her; once he has forgiven her, she will introduce him to the children, and they will live happily together at Foxworth Hall.

Corrine's visits to the attic become less frequent as she begins to enjoy her new-found wealth and starts a relationship with her father's lawyer, Bart Winslow. She informs the children that while her father has forgiven her, she cannot let them meet him because she claimed that she did not have any children; thus, they will have to remain in the attic until Malcolm dies. Corrine's visits all but cease during the next year. Due to lack of fresh air and sunshine, the twins' growth has severely stunted; meanwhile, Cathy and Chris are entering puberty. Chris accidentally walks in on Cathy while she is trying on her first bra. Olivia catches them and calls them sinners and tries to cut off Cathy's hair as punishment. Chris stops her, but she threatens to starve them for a week if he does not cut Cathy's hair himself. Cathy and Chris refuse to comply and give their remaining food to the twins while they rely mostly on water. Olivia appears to relent and leaves them a basket of food; however, Cathy awakens to find tar in her hair the next morning. As Chris reluctantly cuts her hair, he tells her that he finds her beautiful, but knows it is wrong to think of her like that.

Another year passes and Corrine has not visited in months. Cathy and Chris conclude that their mother has abandoned them and begin planning their escape. When Corrine does return, she happily announces she has married Bart and the reason for her absence was her honeymoon in Europe. She is upset that the children are not more excited and seems oblivious to the deterioration in the twins. Olivia soon brings the children sugar-powdered doughnuts, which she says are a gift from their mother. Olivia beats Chris with a belt after he demands to be called by his name rather than "boy".  Cathy tends to his wounds and admits her fear of losing him. Chris assures her nothing will happen to him and they kiss. When Olivia comes to deliver their food, Chris tells her that she was right about them being the "devil's spawn" and pleads for forgiveness. After she leaves, Chris reveals the whole scene was a scheme to get an impression of the attic key in soap, and he carves a wooden copy.

Now able to leave the attic, Cathy and Chris begin to steal money from their mother's room to finance an escape by train. On a night raid, Cathy finds Bart asleep and kisses him. Chris later overhears his mother and Bart talking about a dream of a young, blonde-haired girl coming into the room and kissing Bart. Chris angrily confronts Cathy, who assures him that the kiss meant nothing and she only did it out of curiosity. She kisses him and they end up having sex. Cathy suggests they move to Florida and Chris tells her that he loves her and can never love anyone else. Carrie suddenly announces that Cory isn't feeling good. It becomes obvious that Cory is seriously ill. Cathy tells Olivia and Corrine that Cory is sick and demands her mother take Cory to a hospital, threatening revenge if she does not. The next day, Corrine tells them Cory had pneumonia and died, and has already been buried.

Devastated by Cory's death and in fear for their lives, Cathy and Chris decide to take all the money they have collected and grab as much jewelry as they can and escape. During their search for valuables, they discover that Corrine and Bart have left Foxworth Hall. Chris overhears a conversation between the butler and a maid, and learns that Olivia has been leaving poison to kill "the mice" in the attic and that their grandfather died seven months ago. Cathy shows Chris how Cory's pet mouse has died after eating a piece of powdered doughnut, revealing that the poison was in the powdered sugar on the doughnuts. Olivia then comes to take their key, and Chris restrains her long enough for Cathy and Carrie to escape. Olivia chases after them, but panics due to her claustrophobia when Chris shuts the door and turns the lights off. Olivia tells them that their mother was the one who poisoned them, not her, but they ignore her and climb out the window, fleeing on foot.

During their escape, they run into the butler, who realizes they are Corrine's children. Horrified, he tells them to run while he cuts off the electric fence for them. They board a train to Florida and Chris assures her that their ordeal is finally over. Cathy vows revenge on their mother.

Cast

Production

Writing

Casting
Flowers in the Attic was first announced on July 23, 2013 as a television film for the Lifetime network. It was also announced that the film would star Heather Graham as Corrine Dollanganger and Ellen Burstyn as Olivia Foxworth. It was also announced that the film would be directed by Deborah Chow and written by Kayla Alpert.

On August 14 it was announced that Kiernan Shipka and Mason Dye had been cast as Cathy and Chris respectively. During the same month, it was announced that Dylan Bruce had joined the cast as Bart Winslow, Corrine's love interest.

Release

Broadcast
In its original televised airing, the film was watched by 6.06 million total viewers, and had a rating (percentage) of 1.9 in the 18-49 age demographic. At the time, it was cable's number-one original movie performance since the October 2012 premiere of Steel Magnolias.

Home media
On April 15, 2014, Flowers in the Attic was released in DVD format for Region 1. The single disc featured the entire film, as well as a behind-the-scenes featurette with the cast and crew. It was later re-released on June 23, 2015, with Petals on the Wind as a "Double Feature." On November 10, 2015, it was included in a "4-Film Collection" with Petals on the Wind, If There Be Thorns, and Seeds of Yesterday.

Reception

Critical response
Flowers in the Attic received mixed reviews from critics, albeit far more positive reviews than the 1987 adaptation. Review aggregator website Rotten Tomatoes reports that 52% of 23 critics gave the film a positive review; the average rating is 5.5 out of ten. The film averaged 49 out of 100, based on 22 critics, on Metacritic, indicating "mixed or average reviews".

Accolades
For her performance, Burstyn was nominated for a Critics' Choice Television Award, a Primetime Emmy Award, and a Screen Actors Guild Award. Shipka was nominated an Online Film & Television Association Award for her performance.

Sequels
Based on the next book of the Dollanganger series, Petals on the Wind premiered on Lifetime on May 26, 2014, earning 3.4 million viewers, down from the 6.1 million earned by Flowers. Unlike the book, the film jumped ten years ahead from the events of Flowers. It starred Rose McIver as Cathy, Wyatt Nash as Christopher, replacing Kiernan Shipka and Mason Dye from the previous movie, respectively, and Will Kemp as Julian Marquet, with Heather Graham as Corrine and Ellen Burstyn as Olivia Foxworth. Production for the film began on February 25, 2014, in Los Angeles.

On the premiere of the sequel, Lifetime announced the production of the two following books in the Dollanganger series, If There Be Thorns and Seeds of Yesterday, both which premiered in 2015.  Both sequels were shot by cinematographer James Liston.

References

External links

2014 television films
2014 films
American psychological horror films
Canadian psychological horror films
English-language Canadian films
Child abuse in fiction
Films about death
Films about twins
Films based on American horror novels
Films directed by Deborah Chow
Films scored by Mario Grigorov
Films set in country houses
Films set in Pennsylvania
Films set in the 1950s
Films set in Virginia
Incest in film
Lifetime (TV network) films
Films about mother–daughter relationships
Poisoning in film
Religious horror films
2010s American films
2010s Canadian films